Premiere Club is a skyscraper in Guatemala City, Guatemala located at 4a. Avenida Final x Calle 23, in Zone14. The building has 31 floors and was completed in 1999.

References

Skyscrapers in Guatemala
Buildings and structures in Guatemala City
Buildings and structures completed in 1999
1999 establishments in Guatemala